Vincent Batignole is a French comic-book artist who has provided the artwork for the popular indie comic Gloomcookie, written by Serena Valentino, and published by Slave Labour Graphics.
Batignole is also currently collaborating with Valentino again on the comic project Enchanted.

Other projects he is currently developing including: Justin, and The Greatest Show on Earth.

Works
 ne boit que du the!

References

External links
 Vincent Batignole's LiveJournal
 Vincent Batignole's Deviant Art
 Artist's blog
 Artist's twitter

French comics artists
Living people
Year of birth missing (living people)